The J Line (formerly the Silver Line, sometimes listed as Line 910/950) is a  bus rapid transit route that runs between El Monte, Downtown Los Angeles and Gardena, with some trips continuing to San Pedro. It is one of the two lines in the Metro Busway system operated by the Los Angeles County Metropolitan Transportation Authority (Metro).

The J Line offers frequent, all-stops service along the El Monte Busway and the Harbor Transitway, two grade-separated transit facilities built into the Southern California freeway system. The line was created on December 13, 2009, as part of the conversion of the facilities from high-occupancy vehicle lanes into high-occupancy toll lanes (branded as Metro ExpressLanes) that allow solo drivers to pay a toll to use lanes. The tolls collected have been used to operate the J Line and refurbish the old stations on the line.

As J Line buses travel along the El Monte Busway and the Harbor Transitway, they serve stations built into the center or side of the roadway. There is a  gap between the western end of El Monte Busway and the northern end of the Harbor Transitway in Downtown Los Angeles, where J Line buses travel on surface streets, making a limited number of stops. Along the route, buses serve several of the region's major transportation hubs, including El Monte Station, Union Station, 7th Street/Metro Center station, Harbor Freeway station and the Harbor Gateway Transit Center.

In 2020, the line was renamed from Silver Line to the J Line while retaining its route numbers and the color silver in its square icon as part of renaming all Metro lines.

Service description

Services 
Two services are operated under the J Line name:
 Route 910 operates with daily 24-hour service serving only the portion of the route between El Monte Station, Downtown Los Angeles, and the Harbor Gateway Transit Center.
 Route 950 operates daily service serving the entire route between El Monte Station, Downtown Los Angeles, and San Pedro.

Route description 
The eastern section of the J Line route runs on the El Monte Busway between the El Monte Station in El Monte and Union Station in Downtown Los Angeles. The southern section of the route runs on the Harbor Transitway between 37th Street/USC station in Downtown Los Angeles and the Harbor Gateway Transit Center near the city of Carson. Buses travel between the western end of the El Monte Busway and the northern end of the Harbor Transitway along  of surface streets in Downtown Los Angeles where J Line buses make a limited number of stops near major employment centers, tourist destinations and Metro Rail stations.

J Line route 950 trips continue south of the Harbor Gateway Transit Center along the Harbor Freeway to San Pedro traveling in general-purpose freeway lanes and making two stops en route at stations located on the side of the freeway near off and on-ramps. In San Pedro, J Line route 950 buses once again travel along surface streets, serving the Harbor Beacon Park & Ride and making frequent stops along Pacific Avenue.

Headways

Fares
The J Line charges a premium fare that is higher than most other Metro routes. Metro day passes are accepted as full fare, but all other pass holders must pay for an upgraded 1 zone pass or pay an additional "premium charge" at the time of boarding.

Like the other Metro Rail and Metro Busway lines, the J Line operates on a proof-of-payment system. Passengers may board at either the front or rear door of J Line buses and validate their Transit Access Pass (TAP) electronic fare card at readers located onboard the bus, near the door. Metro's fare inspectors randomly inspect buses to ensure passengers have a valid fare product on their TAP card. Pre-payment of fares and all-door boarding reduces the time buses need to remain stopped at stations.

TAP vending machines are available at most stations (except Carson and Pacific Coast Highway) and near most street stops in Downtown Los Angeles. But, because vending machines are unavailable at all stations and street stops, passengers who need to purchase a card or add funds can do so at the farebox on board the bus. None of the other Metro Rail or Metro Busway lines offer onboard sales.

Metro and Foothill Transit offer a reciprocal fare program where pass holders may ride either J Line or Silver Streak buses between Downtown Los Angeles and the El Monte Station.

Stations & stops

History

The idea for the route now known as the J Line came in 1993, as Los Angeles County Metropolitan Transportation Authority (Metro) staff studied how to operate buses on the Harbor Transitway, which was under construction and would open three years later in the summer of 1996. Metro staff recommended the creation of a dual hub-and-spoke ("dual hub") system with a trunk route that served both the Harbor Transitway and the operationally similar El Monte Busway, which had opened two decades earlier in January 1973. Staff said the dual hub proposal, would be the most efficient and cost less to run, but the Metro Board of Directors decided to continue running bus routes on both the El Monte Busway and Harbor Freeway as they had before.

After the Harbor Transitway opened, ridership was radically lower than expected: Caltrans had projected that 65,200 passengers would travel along the Harbor Transitway each day, but after 10 years, the facility had only attracted 3,000 passengers per weekday. That amount is low compared to the El Monte Busway, which had 32,000 boardings a day in November 2000.

After the very successful launch of the Orange Line busway (now the G Line) in the San Fernando Valley, Metro decided to rebrand the county's other busways in an attempt to increase awareness. In March 2006, Metro decided that the Harbor Transitway would be colored bronze and the El Monte Busway would be colored silver on Metro's maps, and the two would be marketed as a "Combined Transitway Service." No changes were made in the bus routes operated on either facility. The changes were criticized as too complex for irregular and new riders to understand.

Metro returned to its plan for a dual-hub route in 2009, proposing a new bus rapid transit service called the Silver Line (now J Line) utilizing both the Harbor Transitway and the El Monte Busway. The new higher frequency service would be funded by converting both corridors into high occupancy toll (HOT) lanes, to be branded as the Metro ExpressLanes. The bus route began operations on December 13, 2009, and the HOT lanes on the Harbor Transitway went into service on November 10, 2012 and the El Monte Busway's HOT lanes opened on February 22, 2013.

Since the start of the J Line, Metro has been working on refurbishing the aging stations along both the Harbor Transitway and the El Monte Busway. The 1970s-era El Monte Station was demolished and replaced by a new station in October 2012. All the Harbor Transitway stations were refurbished with real-time arrival signs, new wayfinding signage, improved lighting, and soundproofing by late 2012. The El Monte Busway stations received a similar refurbishment in January 2015. Transit Access Pass (TAP) card ticket vending machines were added to stations in early 2017 to support all-door boarding on J Line buses. Metro has also added a new station on the El Monte Busway at Union Station that opened on November 1, 2020.

Efforts have also been made to speed up J Line buses as they cross Downtown Los Angeles on surface streets.

In 2015, Metro integrated the last remaining Metro Express route on the Harbor Transitway, the 450X to San Pedro, into the Silver Line. Initially, a new express Silver Line service was added that served San Pedro and skipped many Harbor Transitway stations, but by June 2017, San Pedro-bound buses were serving all stations, and the increase in speed was deemed not enough to justify increased crowding on other buses.

Future developments
As part of Metro's NextGen Bus Plan, the agency had proposed discontinuing the J Line's route 950, which offers service to San Pedro. Metro said the change would allow the J Line to transition to battery-electric buses and would improve the reliability of buses that operate between El Monte Station and Harbor Gateway Transit Center. Service to San Pedro would have been shifted to a new line between San Pedro and the Harbor Freeway station via I-110, with a peak-hour extension to Downtown Los Angeles. The San Pedro neighborhood opposed the change, with citizens requesting that they also receive electrified bus service and maintain a one-seat ride to Downtown LA and El Monte. As a result, plans to end the J Line's service to San Pedro were put on hold indefinitely.

Ridership and reliability
Ridership has steadily grown on the J Line each year.

An estimated 6,612 passengers rode the line each weekday in January 2010 (the first whole month of operation), and ridership has grown steadily each year since. Ridership set a new all-time high in February 2016, with an estimated 16,884 passengers riding the line each weekday.

The on-time performance of the Metro J Line is currently around 82.4%, defined as being less than 5 minutes behind schedule. That places it far behind the Metro Rail lines (99% on time) and Orange Line (94% on time), but better than an average Metro bus route (80.6% on time). On-time performance benefits from the active traffic management system installed as part of the Metro ExpressLanes project.

Incidents

On February 22, 2012, a drunk driver on the Harbor Freeway mistakenly entered the bus-only station area of the Harbor Freeway station. Lubin swerved to avoid hitting the bus and drove onto the station platform where he hit seven people, critically injuring six, before slamming into a pole on the platform.

After the crash, Metro's CEO Art Leahy asked Metro's safety committee staff to review the layout of busway stations and safety signage on the roadways leading into the station areas. As a result of that investigation, Metro added concrete-filled metal bollards to all stations on the Harbor Transitway and the El Monte Busway to prevent vehicles from entering the platform. Additional markings were added on roadways leading into stations.

Fleet

The Metro J Line primarily operates with a fleet of dedicated NABI Metro 45C CompoBus coaches. Each  bus is made of light composite materials and is powered by compressed natural gas. Coaches are painted or vinyl wrapped with a special grey livery that matches the design of newer Metro Rail vehicles and the coaches used on G Line.

Starting in January 2022, BYD K9M battery-electric buses are being added to the J Line fleet, with plans to have these coaches replace the older fleet sometime in the near future. Like the older fleet, each bus is painted in a special grey livery.

Buses used on the J Line are operated out of Division 9 in El Monte on the grounds of El Monte Station and Division 18 at South Figueroa Street and West Griffith Street in Carson, about a mile south of the Harbor Gateway Transit Center.

See also
 List of Los Angeles Metro Busway stations

References

External links

Metro Silver Line timetable – as of June 2013
Silver Line Map – Overall map of the line
Silver Line destinations – Metro Silver Line destinations guide (English)
Silver Line destinations  – Metro Silver Line destinations guide (Spanish)
A recent report of the Metro Silver Line
Metro's official release about the New Metro Silver Line Released on December 9, 2009.
Metro's proposed security for the Metro Silver Line stations
CBS news article about the Metro Silver Line Accident at Harbor Freeway Station
NBC news article about the Metro Silver Line Accident at Harbor Freeway Station
Metro Silver Line and Foothill Silver Streak Coordination

J Line (Los Angeles Metro)
Los Angeles Metro Busway
Public transportation in Los Angeles
Public transportation in Los Angeles County, California
Downtown Los Angeles
Eastside Los Angeles
South Los Angeles
Harbor Gateway, Los Angeles
Boyle Heights, Los Angeles
Carson, California
El Monte, California
El Sereno, Los Angeles
Gardena, California
San Pedro, Los Angeles
South Park (Downtown Los Angeles)
2009 establishments in California
2009 in transport